
Bilton is a suburb of Harrogate, North Yorkshire, England, situated to the north-east of the town centre.

History
Bilton was first recorded (as Billeton) in the Domesday Book in 1086.  The name is of Old English origin and means "farmstead of a man named Billa".

Bilton was historically in the parish of Knaresborough in the West Riding of Yorkshire.  It formed a township with Harrogate, and in 1866 the township of Bilton with Harrogate became a civil parish.  When Harrogate became a municipal borough in 1894, Bilton remained outside the borough and became a separate civil parish. In 1896, Starbeck was separated from Bilton to form a new civil parish. In 1938 the civil parish was abolished, and most of Bilton was added to Harrogate.

In 1848 the Leeds and Thirsk Railway was opened through Bilton, although no station was built there.  The line crossed the River Nidd on the northern boundary of Bilton by a stone viaduct.  In 1908 the Harrogate Gasworks Railway was constructed from the main line to carry coal to the gasworks next to the Little Wonder roundabout. The line was closed in 1956, and with the tracks having been removed the only remains of the line are some walls and the tunnels that carried the trains.  A small museum was opened in the neighbouring New Park School, where the line used to come out above ground. Between 2007 and 2008 the school created a garden, known as "The Secret Railway Garden", to commemorate the line.

The area of Bilton west of the railway line was developed in the 19th and 20th centuries.  The parish church of St John, designed by Gilbert Scott, was built between 1851 and 1857.  It is now a Grade II* listed building.

The area east of the railway has remained rural, with scattered houses now known as Old Bilton. The main railway line through Bilton was closed in 1969. In 2013 it was reopened as a cycle way and bridleway known as the Nidderdale Greenway.

Bilton Hall is a large former country house lying to the east of Old Bilton on a hill facing Knaresborough. Built on the site of a hunting lodge constructed on the orders of John O'Gaunt in 1380. William Slingsby, who discovered the first spa well in Harrogate, once resided at the Hall. Bilton Hall became the seat of the Stockdale family from 1631, with three members of that family serving as Members of Parliament for Knaresborough. It later passed into institutional use and is now a care home.

Community

Prior to the gala ending in the late 2010s, on the first May Bank Holiday each year the Bilton Gala took place. The first Gala was held in 1977 and the event, which is attended by local families, raises money for groups and organisations within the local community.

Bilton has five churches, four primary schools and its own library. There are a number of shops, including two convenience stores. The Library closed but has now re-opened on the site of Woodfield Primary School. Bilton has its own online community page, called the Bilton Community Group on Facebook. Started in lockdown to bring a larger ‘sense of community to the area’.

There is one public house, the Gardeners Arms, in Old Bilton. The Skipton (formerly the Dragon) on Skipton Road closed in February 2014 and The Oak Beck public house on Woodfield Road has been demolished and is being replaced with eight dwellings. There is a working men's club on Skipton Road. The Red Cat Cottage (formerly Red Cat Inn), a Grade II listed building is located in the area. It is situated close to the Nidd Gorge conservation area.

Transport
Roads out of Bilton lead to Skipton Road, the major artery across North Harrogate, resulting in very heavy congestion at peak times, and heavy traffic throughout the day.

The number 2 bus route runs between Bilton and Harrogate bus station. It is split into service 2A and 2B; 2B serving the Knox area of Bilton while 2A runs along Bilton Lane towards Fieldway and Woodfield.

A railway station is proposed on the Harrogate Line at Bilton.

References

External links

Harrogate district council information on visiting
Bilton Historical Society

Villages in North Yorkshire
Geography of Harrogate
Former civil parishes in North Yorkshire